The 1962–63 National Hurling League was the 32nd season of the NHL, an annual hurling competition for the GAA county teams.  won their second title.

Division 1

Tipperary came into the season as defending champions of the 1961-62 season.

On 3 November 1963, Waterford won the title after a 3-10 to 1-10 win over New York in the final replay. It was their first league title.

Waterford's Phil Grimes was the Division 1 top scorer with 6-31.

Division 1A table

Group stage

Play-off

Division 1B table

Group stage

Division 1C table

Group stage

Knock-out stage

Semi-final

Home final

Finals

Top scorers

Top scorers overall

Top scorers in a single game

Miscellaneous

 On 21 October 1962, Carlow defeated Cork by 1-17 to 1-12. It remains their only ever defeat of Cork in the National Hurling League.

References

National Hurling League seasons
Lea
Lea